Gongadi Trisha (born 15 December 2005) is an Indian cricketer who currently plays for Hyderabad. She plays as an all-rounder, batting right-handed and bowling right-arm leg break. She was part of the India team that won the inaugural Under-19 Women's T20 World Cup.

Early life 
Trisha was born in Bhadrachalam, Telangana. Her father, whilst working as a fitness trainer in a private company, recognized her talent and encouraged her to play cricket regularly, and left his job and moved to Secunderabad from Bhadrachalam to train his daughter in cricket. At seven years old, Trisha was admitted to the St John's Cricket Academy.

Career 
After playing for Hyderabad and South Zone age group teams, Trisha made her debut for Hyderabad in the 2017–18 Senior Women's T20 League. She represented India B in the 2021–22 U19 Women's Cricket Challengers, as well as the 2021–22 Senior Women's Challenger Trophy in Vijayawada, Andhra Pradesh.

In January 2023, Trisha played for India at the 2023 ICC Under-19 Women's T20 World Cup. In the final of the tournament, she top-scored with 24 as her side won by 7 wickets.

References

External links
 
 

2005 births
Living people
Cricketers from Telangana
Indian women cricketers
Hyderabad women cricketers